Salahuddin Lavlu (born 24 January) is a Bangladeshi television film director, actor, and screenwriter. His works generally consist of single episode television dramas and telenovelas. His notable works include Ronger Manush (2004), Vober Hat (2007),  Ghor Kutum (2008), Alta Sundori (2009) and Sakin Sarisuri (2009), Har Kipte (2011), Kobuliotnama (2015),  The Village Engineer (2016), Shonar Pakhi Rupar Pakhi (2017) and Priyo Din Priyo Raat (2018). Salahuddin Lavlu is the president of the Directors Guild.

Early life
Salahuddin Lavlu was born in Jugia village, near Kushtia town of  Kushtia District in the Khulna Division of western Bangladesh.

Career

Early career
In 1977, Salahuddin Lavlu moved to Dhaka, to join the Aranyak Natyadal Theatre, where he played roles in stage plays until 1985 but desired to focus on other activities. During 1979-84, he used to act as a member of the director's panel of the theatre.

He directed several dramas since 1989-95 as the founder member of Desh Natok, and later on, was elected chief of the executive committee of the same group. After Bangladesh Television (BTV) started its own production, he appeared in several television dramas. In the early 1990s, he explored other options and began working as a photographer. In 1997, after working as a photographer for about six years, he found a new passion as a director.

Acting and directing
Salahuddin Lavlu made his Television film directorial debut with Koitob, written by Masum Reza. Among the critically acclaimed television drama he directed by 2004 are Dichakrojaan (1997), Gahargachi (1997), Ekjon Aynal Lashkar (1999), Adhuli (2002) and Gor (2002).

Since 2004, Salahuddin Lavlu has directed and acted in many different telenovelas.  Ronger Manush (2004) was his first telenovela directorial debut.  Following its success, he pursued making more of them. Since then he has directed and acted in several telenovelas.  Two of these include Vober Hat (2007) and Ghor Kutum (2008). Both of these telenovelas included the same stars, such as Mosharraf Karim and Chanchal Chowdhury (a favorite of Salahuddin Lavlu's, cast in most of his work).

Salahuddin Lavlu has also acted in and directed many television films including Goruchor (2007), Potro Mitali (2007), Swapner Bilat (2007), Dholer Baddo (2008), Patri Chai (2009) and Warren (2009).
 Mellowed encompassing more than 200 dramas as well as 15 tv drama serials
 Produced TV commercials (both mercantile and social spots) encircling more than 100.

Operating camera 
 Produced exceeding 100 tv commercials
 More than 200 tv dramas had been contrived.

Currently actively working on 
 TV dramas
 Twin role goes as a director and cameraman single-handedly.
 has been performing in tv dramas, which in essence, is my ardor.

Filmography

Film

Television

Web series

Judge 

 Prominent playwright and actor Salahuddin Lavlu has acted as a judge in a multi-talent hunt reality show called Ananya Protiva' on NTV.

 Awards and recognition 
Best cameraman
1999, ad film award by Bangladesh Cine Journalist association.
2001-TV Drama – single-episode awarded by Bangladesh Cine Journalist Association.
2001-TV Drama serial  awarded by Bangladesh Cine Journalist Association.
2001- TV Drama single-episode  awarded by Bangladesh Television Reporters Association.
2001-TV Drama serial awarded by Bangladesh Television Reporters Association
2002- TV Drama awarded by Television Darshak Forum (TDF).
2002- TV Drama awarded by Smart Awarded.
2003-TV Drama serial awarded by Uro Binodon Bichitra.
2003- TV Drama serial awarded by Bangladesh Cine Journalist Association.

 Best director 
1998-Critic award, by Meril-Prothom Alo.
2000-Critic award, by Impress-anyadin performance award committee.
2001-TV Drama - single-episode awarded by Bangladesh Cine Journalist Association.
2001-TV Drama - serial awarded by Bangladesh Cine Journalist Association.
2001- TV Drama single-episode  awarded by Bangladesh Television Reporters Association.
2001-TV Drama serial awarded by Bangladesh Television Reporters Association
2001-TV Drama awarded by Fulkoli.
2003-TV Drama - serial awarded by Bangladesh Cine Journalist Association.
2005 Lux-Channel i Performance Awards Best Director for Molla Barir Bou''

 Best producer cum director 
 1999- TV Drama - single-episode awarded by Bangladesh Cine Journalist Association. 2001-TV Drama single-episode  awarded by Bangladesh Television Reporters Association'''.

References

External links
 

Living people
People from Khulna
21st-century Bangladeshi male actors
Bangladeshi male film actors
Bangladeshi male writers
Bangladeshi male stage actors
Male telenovela actors
Telenovela writers
Bangladeshi male television actors
Bangladeshi television writers
Bangladeshi television directors
Recipients of the National Film Awards (Bangladesh)
Male television writers
1962 births